In geometry, a compound of three tetrahedra can be constructed by three tetrahedra rotated by 60 degree turns along an axis of the middle of an edge. It has dihedral symmetry, D3d, order 12. It is a uniform prismatic compound of antiprisms, UC23.

It is similar to the compound of two tetrahedra with 90 degree turns. It has the same vertex arrangement as the convex hexagonal antiprism.

Related polytopes

A subset of edges of this compound polyhedron can generate a compound regular skew polygon, with 3 skew squares. Each tetrahedron contains one skew square. This regular compound polygon containing the same symmetry as the uniform polyhedral compound.

References
.

External links 
 

Polyhedral compounds